Or Alon Israelov (born 2 September 2004) is an Israeli professional footballer who plays as a  center-back for Israeli Premier League club Hapoel Tel Aviv and the Israel national under-19 team.

Career statistics

Club

References

2004 births
Living people
Israeli footballers
Israel youth international footballers
Association football defenders
Hapoel Tel Aviv F.C. players
Israeli Premier League players
Footballers from Shoham